Im Kang-sung is a South Korean actor, model and singer. He is known for his roles in dramas such as My Healing Love, Money Flower and Hidden Identity. He also appeared in movie Voice of Silence as Yong-seok.

Personal life
Im Kang-sung was married to Lee Seul-ni in 2011 and they divorced in 2015. In 2017 he married Lee Eun-yul.

Filmography

Television series

Film

Variety show

Awards and nominations
 2018 MBC Drama Awards Nominated Excellence Award, Actor in a Soap Opera

References

External links
 
 

1981 births
Living people
21st-century South Korean male actors
South Korean male models
South Korean male television actors
South Korean male film actors
South Korean male singers
South Korean pop singers